Bernardo F. Piñol Jr. (born September 23, 1957) is a Filipino politician and journalist. A member of the Lakas-CMD Party, he was a Member of the House of Representatives of the Philippines, representing the Second District of North Cotabato from 2007 until 2010, when he was defeated in his re-election bid by Nancy A. Catamco. He is a brother of Agriculture Secretary and former Cotabato Governor Manny Piñol.

References

 

.

Filipino journalists
Living people
1957 births
Lakas–CMD (1991) politicians
Members of the House of Representatives of the Philippines from Cotabato
People from Cotabato
Hiligaynon people